René Simon (1898 in Troyes – 1971) was a French actor and founder in 1925 of the Cours Simon drama school in Paris. Notable alumni of Cours Simon include Benoît Petitjean and Jean Reno.

References

External links

1898 births
1971 deaths
French male film actors
People from Troyes
French National Academy of Dramatic Arts alumni
20th-century French male actors